Ruth Leone Duccini ( Robinson; July 23, 1918 – January 16, 2014) was an American actress.

Biography
Ruth is best known as the penultimate surviving Munchkin from the 1939 film The Wizard of Oz. Her role in the film as a Munchkin villager was not credited. Her most recent appearances were when she and the other surviving Munchkins were presented with a star on the Hollywood Walk of Fame on November 21, 2007, and attending the premiere of the film's 75th anniversary at the Grauman's Chinese Theatre. She also was seen in Under the Rainbow (1981) and Memories of Oz (2001).

While Duccini could not recall in 2013 what she earned filming Oz, the Munchkin village actors were paid $50 a week during filming, plus room/board. She said of her World War II work: 

Duccini made the news again when Margaret Thatcher died, and critics of the former British premier tried to propel "Ding-Dong! The Witch Is Dead" onto the chart to celebrate her passing. Duccini and Jerry Maren (who would become the last surviving adult Munchkin) said the song was never to be used in such a way, stating:

Death
Duccini died of natural causes in Las Vegas, aged 95, on January 16, 2014. She outlived every major cast member of The Wizard of Oz.

Filmography

References

External links

The Wizard of Oz Special Screening Honoring the Munchkins Photo Gallery

1918 births
2014 deaths
Actors with dwarfism
Actresses from Minnesota
American film actresses
People from Chisago County, Minnesota
20th-century American actresses
21st-century American women